Babili Amos Shili, popularly known by his stage name Aymos is a South African singer-songwriter. He is best known for the hit single "Emcimbini" which was produced by Kabza De Small and DJ Maphorisa.

Early life and career
Aymos was born in Tembisa, Johannesburg. He started out by singing at church and in high school, he formed his own choir.

In 2020, he released a collaborative album with Mas Musiq titled Shonamalanga. The album was nominated at the 27th South African Music Awards for best amapiano album and best duo/group of the year.

In September 2021, he released his debut album Yimi Lo. The album features Kabza De Small and South African musicians Major League DJz, Josiah De Disciple and DBN Gogo.

In May 2022, he made collaboration  on African Lullabies Part 2, album by Platoon.

His single "Fatela" with Ami Faku was released on October 28, 2022. The song was certified platinum in South Africa.

Discography
 Shonamalanga 
 Yim Lo  (2021)
 Fatela (2023)

Awards and nominations

References

Living people
Amapiano musicians
South African singer-songwriters
South African musicians
People from Gauteng
Year of birth missing (living people)